Ivan Alexander Walsh (29 December 1924 – 12 May 2005) was a football (soccer) player who represented New Zealand at international level.

Walsh scored on his full New Zealand debut in a 6–4 win over New Caledonia on 22 September 1951 and ended his international playing career with four official A-international caps and four goals to his credit, scoring a hat-trick in his final appearance, a 9–0 win over New Hebrides on 4 October 1951.

He also played three first-class matches for Otago in the Plunket Shield.

See also
 List of Otago representative cricketers

References

External links
Profile at Cricinfo

1924 births
2005 deaths
New Zealand association footballers
New Zealand international footballers
New Zealand cricketers
Otago cricketers
Association football forwards